The Chicago Hittite Dictionary (CHD) (The Hittite Dictionary of the Oriental Institute of the University of Chicago) is a project at the University of Chicago Oriental Institute to create a comprehensive dictionary of the Hittite language. The project was founded by Hans Gustav Güterbock and Harry Hoffner in 1975 and funded by the National Endowment for the Humanities. It is currently co-edited by Theo van den Hout and Petra Goedegebuure. Hoffner originally hoped that the project could be completed by 2000, though as of 2005 it was expected to last until 2045. It is one of several dictionary projects at the Institute, including the Chicago Assyrian Dictionary and the Chicago Demotic Dictionary.

List of volumes

References

External links
The Chicago Hittite Dictionary Project
The Electronic Chicago Hittite Dictionary (eCHD) (requires Java)
List of published volumes

Hittite dictionaries
Translation dictionaries